Liberty-Eylau High School is a public high school located in Texarkana, Texas, United States near the unincorporated town of Eylau and classified as a 4A school by the UIL. It is part of the Liberty-Eylau Independent School District located in southeastern Bowie County. In 2015, the school was rated "Met Standard" by the Texas Education Agency.

The High School campus is divided up into 2 parts, East Campus (9-10), and West Campus (11-12). A major addition was added to the campus in 2004, a multipurpose building entitled the Rader Dome. Named after Don Rader. The Rader Dome is home for many volleyball and basketball games.

Athletics
The Liberty-Eylau Leopards compete in these sports:

Baseball
Basketball
Cross Country
Football
Golf
Powerlifting
Softball
Tennis
Track and Field
Volleyball

State titles
Baseball -
2006(3A)
Football -
1999(3A), 2006(3A)
Girls Basketball -
2010(3A)
Girls Track -
2010(3A), 2011(3A)

Note: Liberty-Eylau also holds state titles in academics, but does not elect to list those.

Notable alumni
Melvin Bunch, former Kansas City Royals and Seattle Mariners pitcher
Tra Carson, former Green Bay Packers running back, and Cincinnati Bengals
LaMichael James, former Oregon Ducks running back (Heisman Trophy finalist); has played for NFL's San Francisco 49ers, Miami Dolphins
Brandon Jones, former Seattle Seahawks and Jacksonville Jaguars wide receiver
Jarrion Lawson, sprinter and long jumper, 3-time NCAA champion in 2016, silver medalist at 2017 World Championships
Ramos McDonald, former Minnesota Vikings cornerback
Will Middlebrooks, former starting third baseman for San Diego Padres, Boston Red Sox Class of 2007. 
Willie Teal, former LSU and Minnesota Vikings cornerback
Byron Williams, former New York Giants wide receiver

References

External links
Liberty-Eylau ISD

Schools in Bowie County, Texas
Public high schools in Texas